Reengineering can refer to:
 Troubleshooting
 Business process reengineering
 Reengineering (software)

ar:هندرة